Club Villa Dálmine is an Argentine football club from Campana, Buenos Aires Province. The team currently plays in Primera B Nacional, the second level of the Argentine football league system.

Due to a financial crisis, the club was named "Club Atlético Campana" between 1993 and February 2000, after which it reassumed its original and current name.

History
At the end of the 1950s the "Dálmine SAFTA" factory, sited in the city of Campana, Buenos Aires Province, founded a social club with the purpose to allow its employees to practise sports. The club was named "Villa Dálmine", establishing its first location on Chiclana street of that city.

The color adopted for the club was violet, therefore the club and its fans have been familiarly called "El Viola" (an expression derived from the word "violeta" in Spanish) since then. In 1960 Dálmine joins Liga Campanense de Fútbol with a team mostly formed by workers and administrative employees of the company. One year later Villa Dálmine affiliated to Torneo de Aficionados (currently Primera D), becoming champion that same year and subsequently promoting to the upper division, Primera C. The team scored the most goals and received the fewest goals during that season.

That first champion was coached by José "Perico" Marante and the most frequent line-up was: Masuelli, Gutiérrez, Coronel, Dopazo, Chiarle, Monteiro, Burián, Menéndez, Montero, Cesáreo, Torello and Moyano. Most of those players were professionals unlike Primera D players, who usually are amateur and they had other jobs to make a living. In 1963, two years after promoting to Primera C, Villa Dálmine won another title, promoting to Primera B Metropolitana. Because two teams had finished the season sharing the first position with 52 points each, a playoff series had to be played in order to determine a champion. The rival was All Boys and Dálmine won the series, after the first game ended 0–0 and the second was won by El Viola 1–0.

Peruvian Jorge Benítez, a skilled player, was the most notable footballer of that team. He is also regarded by fans as the best Dálmine player ever.

Despite all those achievements, Villa Dálmine would be relegated soon, although the team would win another Primera C title in 1975, returning to B Metropolitana (simply "Primera B" by then). The team made a great campaign that season, totaling 60 points in 36 matches played. Because of its bright play and high accuracy, it was nicknamed "The Netherlands of the C", making a comparison with the renowned 1974 Dutch football team led by Johan Cruyff, which was also known as "The Clockwork Orange" because of the extraordinary playing style they had showed on the field.

In the 1980s Dálmine was relegated to Primera C although the squad would promote to Primera B in 1984. During those times the club created a Football School, with the purpose of promoting the practise of football among the children from Campana. Some of them would take part of the first team in successive years.

In 1985 the club was split into two institutions, so "Villa Dálmine" became a club focused exclusively on football. On the other hand, "Club Siderca" was established to host the rest of social and recreation activities.

During the 1990s the club changed its name to "Atlético Campana", which was rejected by most of the fans, so the institution brought its name back in February 2000. In 2002 Dálmine won another title, the Primera C Apertura, with a roster formed by players such as Pedro Troglio, Roberto Monserrat, Raúl Cardozo, Mario Pobersnik and José Basualdo, nicknamed "Los Cinco Magníficos" ("The Magnificent Five"). In 2003 Basualdo retired as a player becoming team's coach.

Honours
Primera B (1): 1988–89
Primera C (3): 1963, 1975, 1982, 1995–96, 2011–12
Primera D (2): 1961

External links

 
 Web del Viola

Association football clubs established in 1957
Football clubs in Buenos Aires Province
1957 establishments in Argentina